Simultaneous perturbation stochastic approximation (SPSA) is an algorithmic method for optimizing systems with multiple unknown parameters. It is a type of stochastic approximation algorithm. As an optimization method, it is appropriately suited to large-scale population models, adaptive modeling, simulation optimization, and atmospheric modeling. Many examples are presented at the SPSA website http://www.jhuapl.edu/SPSA. A comprehensive book on the subject is Bhatnagar et al. (2013). An early paper on the subject is Spall (1987) and the foundational paper providing the key theory and justification is Spall (1992). 

SPSA is a descent method capable of finding global minima, sharing this property with other methods as simulated annealing. Its main feature is the gradient approximation that requires only two measurements of the objective function, regardless of the dimension of the optimization problem. Recall that we want to find the optimal control  with loss
function :

Both Finite Differences Stochastic Approximation (FDSA)
and SPSA use the same iterative process: 

where 
If  is a p-dimensional vector, the  component of the symmetric finite difference gradient estimator is:

FD: 

1 ≤i ≤p, where  is the unit vector with a 1 in the 
place, and is a small positive number that decreases with n. With this method, 2p evaluations of J for each  are needed. Clearly, when p is large, this estimator loses efficiency.

Let now   be a random perturbation vector. The  component of the stochastic perturbation gradient estimator is:

SP: 

Remark that FD perturbs only one direction at a time, while the SP estimator disturbs all directions at the same time (the numerator is identical in all p components). The number of loss function measurements needed in the SPSA method for each  is always 2, independent of the dimension p. Thus, SPSA uses p times fewer function evaluations than FDSA, which makes it a lot more efficient.

Simple experiments with p=2 showed that SPSA converges in the same number of iterations as FDSA. The latter follows approximately the steepest descent direction, behaving like the gradient method. On the other hand, SPSA, with the random search direction, does not follow exactly the gradient path. In average though, it tracks it nearly because the gradient approximation is an almost unbiased
estimator of the gradient, as shown in the following lemma.

Convergence lemma 
Denote by 

the bias in the estimator . Assume that  are all mutually independent with zero-mean, bounded second
moments, and  uniformly bounded. Then →0 w.p. 1.

Sketch of the proof 

The result follows from the hypothesis that →0.

The efficiency of
First, the algorithm parameters must satisfy the
following conditions:

A good choice would be  a>0;
  , where c>0, ;
 
The inverse first and second moments of the  must be finite.
Bernoulli +-1 with probability 0.5. Other choices are possible too, but note that the uniform and normal distributions cannot be used because they do not satisfy the finite inverse moment conditions.

The loss function J(u) must be thrice continuously differentiable and the individual elements of the third derivative must be bounded: .

In addition,  must be Lipschitz continuous, bounded and the ODE  must have a unique solution for each initial condition.
Under these conditions and a few others,  converges in probability to the set of global minima of J(u) (see Maryak and Chin, 2008).

It has been shown that differentiability is not required: continuity and convexity are sufficient for convergence.

Extension to second-order (Newton) methods 
It is known that a stochastic version of the standard (deterministic) Newton-Raphson algorithm (a “second-order” method) provides an asymptotically optimal or near-optimal form of stochastic approximation. SPSA can also be used to efficiently estimate the Hessian matrix of the loss function based on either noisy loss measurements or noisy gradient measurements (stochastic gradients). As with the basic SPSA method, only a small fixed number of loss measurements or gradient measurements are needed at each iteration, regardless of the problem dimension p. See the brief discussion in Stochastic gradient descent.

References
 Bhatnagar, S., Prasad, H. L., and Prashanth, L. A. (2013), Stochastic Recursive Algorithms for Optimization: Simultaneous Perturbation Methods, Springer .
 Hirokami, T., Maeda, Y., Tsukada, H. (2006) "Parameter estimation using simultaneous perturbation stochastic approximation", Electrical Engineering in Japan, 154 (2), 30–3 
 Maryak, J.L., and Chin, D.C. (2008), "Global Random Optimization by Simultaneous Perturbation Stochastic Approximation," IEEE Transactions on Automatic Control, vol. 53, pp. 780-783.
 Spall, J. C. (1987), “A Stochastic Approximation Technique for Generating Maximum Likelihood Parameter Estimates,” Proceedings of the American Control Conference, Minneapolis, MN, June 1987, pp. 1161–1167.
 Spall, J. C. (1992), “Multivariate Stochastic Approximation Using a Simultaneous Perturbation Gradient Approximation,” IEEE Transactions on Automatic Control, vol. 37(3), pp. 332–341. 
 Spall, J.C. (1998). "Overview of the Simultaneous Perturbation Method for Efficient Optimization" 2. Johns Hopkins APL Technical Digest, 19(4), 482–492.
 Spall, J.C. (2003) Introduction to Stochastic Search and Optimization: Estimation, Simulation, and Control, Wiley.  (Chapter 7)

Numerical climate and weather models
Stochastic optimization
Randomized algorithms
Optimization algorithms and methods